The Massachusetts Area South Asian Lambda Association (MASALA) is a Boston-based organization for "Gay, Lesbian, Bi, Trans, and Questioning" people of South Asian ethnicity. It was founded in 1994 and is the only organization designed specifically for all queer South Asians in New England. For the purposes of MASALA, "South Asian" is defined as being from "Afghanistan, Bangladesh, India, Maldives, Nepal, Pakistan, Sri Lanka, and Tibet; and from the global South Asian Diaspora".

It is a frequent sponsor of film screenings, lectures and other cultural events. It also hosts an annual party in the fall.  "Our aim is to increase the awareness of our presence in the social spaces that we inhabit and welcome alliances with like-minded individuals and groups regardless of their ethnic/cultural/sexual identities." MASALA has connections with many of the colleges and universities in New England. The group also holds monthly potlucks at various locations throughout Boston.

See also

List of LGBT organizations

References

External links
Interview with Dr. Aida Khan
Myspace profile
Interview with Film maker Sarav Chidambaram

Asian-American culture in Massachusetts
LGBT culture in Boston
LGBT in Massachusetts
LGBT organizations in the United States
LGBT and multiculturalism
Organizations based in Boston
South Asian American organizations
LGBT Asian-American culture
Organizations established in 1994
1994 establishments in Massachusetts